Christopher Schwarze (born March 9, 1983) is a retired American soccer defender who played professionally in the USL First Division.

Scwharze attended the University of San Francisco, playing on the men's soccer team from 2001 to 2004. He graduated with a bachelor's degree in marketing. On February 4, 2005, the FC Dallas selected Schwarze in the third round of the 2005 MLS Supplemental Draft. In 2005, he played for the Nevada Wonders of the USL Premier Development League.  In 2006, he signed with the Virginia Beach Mariners of the USL First Division.  In 2007, he moved to the California Victory.

References

1983 births
Living people
People from Camarillo, California
American soccer players
Soccer players from California
California Victory players
Nevada Wonders players
University of San Francisco alumni
San Francisco Dons men's soccer players
FC Dallas draft picks
Virginia Beach Mariners players
USL First Division players
USL League Two players
Association football defenders